Earl Spencer was an East Indiaman, launched in 1795 for the British East India Company (EIC). She made seven voyages for the EIC until in 1811-12 the government took her up to transport convicts to Australia in 1813. On her return voyage from Australia she sailed via China, where she carried a cargo back to England for the EIC.

EIC voyages
As most of her voyages took place during wartime, Earl Spencer frequently sailed under a letter of marque that authorized her to engage in offensive actions against the French, not just defensive. When the vessel changed masters, a new letter was issued. The outbreak of war after a period of peace also required a new letter.

EIC voyage #1 (1795-96)
Captain Thomas Denton left The Downs on 26 September 1795, bound for Bengal. His letter of marque had been issued on 5 September. On 20 Feb 1796 Earl Spencer reached Kedgeree. Homeward bound, she was at Saugor on 3 April, reached False Bay on 12 August and the Cape on 4 September. She arrived at Crookhaven on 27 November and Long Reach on 16 December.

EIC voyage #2 (1797-99)
Captain Charles Raitt left Portsmouth on 5 June 1797 for Madras and Bengal. He had a letter of marque issued on 13 March 1797. Earl Spencer reached Simons Bay on 4 September and Madras on 2 December. She arrived at Kedgeree on 26 January 1798. Homeward bound, she was at Saugor on 20 April, Simons Bay on 22 August, the Cape on 30 September, and St Helena on 17 November. She arrived at The Downs on 3 February 1799.

EIC voyage #3 (1800-01)
Captain Charles Raitt left Portsmouth on 28 June 1800, bound for Bengal. Earl Spencer arrived at Kedgeree on 8 January 1801. Homeward bound, she was at Saugor on 7 April. The pilot left them on 12 April. Countess proved to be a much faster sailer than the two East Indiamen and parted from them on 8 April.

Earl Spencer reached St Helena on 4 August and arrived at the Downs on 1 November.

EIC voyage #4 (1803-05)
Charles Raitt was again captain of Earl Spencer on her third voyage. The Napoleonic Wars having broken out after the one year of peace following the Treaty of Amiens, he received a new letter of marque on 8 June 1803. Raitt left Portsmouth on 30 June 1803, bound for Bengal. Earl Spencer reached Rio de Janeiro on 16 September.

The Indiamen Earl Spencer, Princess Mary, Anna, Ann, and Essex left Rio on 13 October. Three days later Albion and Sceptre separated from the rest of the ships.

Earl Spencer arrived at Diamond Harbour on 11 February 1804. She was at Saugor on 26 April, and Madras on 16 August, before reaching St Helena on 31 December. She arrived at The Downs on 19 March 1805.

EIC voyage #5 (1806-07)
A change of captain meant a new letter of marque. Captain George Heming received a letter of marque on 21 July 1806. He sailed from Portsmouth on 9 August, bound for Bombay. Earl Spencer reached Rio de Janeiro on 13 November, the Cape on 15 January 1807, and Colombo on 5 April. She arrived at Bombay on 21 May. Homeward bound, she was at the Cape on 11 October, reached St Helena on 24 October, and arrived at the Downs on 29 December.

EIC voyage #6 (1808-10)
Captain George Heming sailed from Portsmouth on 10 June 1808, bound for Madras and Bengal. Earl Spencer was at Madeira on 24 June, and arrived at Diamond Harbour on 16 November.

On 2 January 1809 Earl Spencer was at Calcutta. Earl Spencer was at Saugor on 14 March.

On 2 May 1809 she departed from the Sandheads with a convoy of four other Indiamen and several smaller vessels, all under the escort of HMS Victor. On 24 May a storm split the convoy and Victor and the small ships separately lost touch with the Indiamen. One of the five, had a leak that had worsened. Hawes, Monarchs captain, requested that another of the Indiamen accompany him in case Monarch foundered. Dale detailed Earl Spencer to go with Monarch. The three remaining Indiamen, Streatham, and  continued on their way while hoping to meet up with Victor. The French frigate  captured Streatham and Europe in the action of 31 May 1809. Lord Keith too exchanged broadsides with Caroline and was damaged, however she escaped and sailed to Penang to repair.

Monarch and Lord Spencer arrived at Penang on 4 June. Lord Keith arrived on 10 June. Repairs completed, all three then sailed together and reached St Helena on 14 November; they arrived at The Downs on 19 or 20 January 1810.

EIC voyage #7 (1810-11)
Captain George Heming left Portsmouth on 9 June 1810 bound for Bengal. Earl Spencer reached Madeira on 25 June and arrived at Diamond Harbour on 12 December.  escorted the Indiamen on the voyage, and on their arrival at Kedgeree on 15 December, Captain George Sayer, captain of Leda, wrote a letter of commendation for Heming and his officers for their conduct on the voyage. On 3 February 1811 Earl Spencer was at Saugor, and on 20 February she was at Madras. She reached St Helena on 16 June and arrived at The Downs on 30 August.

The government then took up Earl Spencer to transport convicts to Australia.

Convict transport and EIC voyage #8
Under the command of William Mitchell, Earl Spencer left England on 2 June 1813. She transported 200 male convicts, four of whom died on the voyage. An officer and 38 men of the 73rd Regiment of Foot provided the guards for the prisoners. Some 20 free settlers came too as passengers. Aboard the ship was the first steam engine brought out to Australia.

Earl Spencer left Port Jackson bound for China, but there is no date given. Between her arrival in New South Wales and her departure for China, she engaged in whaling.

Earl Spenser arrived at Whampoa anchorage on 23 October 1814. She passed the Bocca Tigris on 12 November, reaching the Cape on 26 March 1815, and St Helena on 24 April. From there she sailed "towards England" on 20 June.

Fate
The last listing in Lloyd's Register and the Register of Shipping for Earl Spencer was in 1820, with the listing unchanged from 1813.

Citations

References
 
 
 

1795 ships
Ships built on the River Thames
Convict ships to New South Wales
Ships of the British East India Company
Whaling ships